South Limburg (Dutch: Zuid-Limburg, Limburgish: Zuud-Limburg) is both a COROP (statistical) region as well as a landstreek (area) of the Netherlands located in the province of Limburg. The Dutch term landstreek, literally translated "land area/region", means that the area is not an administrative region but an area that displays cohesion with regard to culture and landscape. With regards to South Limburg this deals with its hilly landscape, especially in the Heuvelland region, sunken lanes, an abundance of castles, and the regional language Limburgish spoken by a significant part of the population alongside Dutch.

The region South Limburg in addition, although extended a little further north to Roermond, forms a constituent part of the Euroregion Meuse-Rhine.

Estate region Maastricht-Meerssen

The estate region Maastricht-Meerssen (Dutch: Landgoederenzone Maastricht - Meerssen) is the name for an area stretching from the northeastern parts of Maastricht to the south of Meerssen that is characterised by a large number of estates. The area is crossed by three rivers (namely the Meuse, Geul and Kanjel). A majority of said estates have been built (or renovated) by the 19th century Maastrichtian industrialist Petrus Regout and his descendants. Challenges to transforming the entire region into a recreational area are posed by the crossing of the A2 motorway and various railways through the area as well as the industrial area of Beatrixhaven.

The region spans six neighbourhoods of Maastricht namely:
 Amby: homestead Withuishof, homestead Gravenhof, house Severen, homestead Hagenhof (or Tiendschuur van Amby) and castle Geuselt
 Nazareth: castle Mariënwaard (La Grande Suisse), villa Petite Suisse and villa Kruisdonk
 Limmel: castles Bethlehem and Jerusalem
 Meerssenhoven: castles Vaeeshartelt and Meerssenhoven and villa Klein Vaeshartelt
 Itteren*: homestead Hartelstein
 Borgharen*: Borgharen castle and homestead Wiegershof
(* some publications do not include Itteren and Borgharen in the estate region)

And in Meerssen:
 Weert: homestead Weerterhof and villa Zonnevang
 Rothem: mill IJzeren Molen

Municipalities 

The South Limburg contains 18 administrative municipalities (gemeenten):

Cities

Impressions of South Limburg

See also 
 South Limburg (Belgium), region in the southern part of the Belgian province of Limburg

External links

Vision on the future of the estate region (Dutch)
The estate region on wigosite.nl (Dutch)
The Regout estates (English)

 
Regions of Limburg (Netherlands)
Regions of the Netherlands